Studena may refer to:

 Studená, Slovakia, a village near Rimavská Sobota, Slovakia
 Studená (Jindřichův Hradec District), a village in the Czech Republic
 Studená (Plzeň-North District), a village in the Czech Republic
 Studena, Croatia, a village near Klana, Croatia
 Studena, Haskovo Province, a village in Bulgaria
 Studena, a village in Cornereva Commune, Caraş-Severin County, Romania
 Studena (Babušnica), a village in Serbia
 Studena (Vranje), a village in Serbia
 Studena Point, a place in Antarctica
 Studena planina, a mountain in Serbia